Joe Junior Christensen (July 21, 1929 – May 18, 2021) was a president of Ricks College (1985 to 1989) and a general authority in the Church of Jesus Christ of Latter-day Saints (LDS Church) from 1989 until his death. He was also president of the San Diego California Temple from 1999 to 2002.

Christensen served as an officer in the United States Air Force during the Korean War, from 1953 to 1955.  He received a bachelor's degree from Brigham Young University and a Ph.D. from Washington State University.

Christensen then became an institute director for the Church Educational System (CES), including at the University of Utah for a time.

For a few months in 1970, Christensen served as president of the LDS Church's mission headquartered in Mexico City.  However, he was appointed to work under Neal A. Maxwell, who was the Commissioner of Church Education, in running the church's seminaries and institutes and was replaced as mission president. Christensen was an associate commissioner in CES from 1970 to 1985, interrupted by a four-year term as president of the LDS Church's Missionary Training Center in Provo, Utah. As associate commissioner he led the expansion of the seminaries and institutes program, especially internationally in the 1970s. One major development he oversaw was recruiting local church members to lead the program in most countries. Starting in 1977, under the leadership of Henry B. Eyring, Christensen continued to oversee seminaries and institutes, while adding responsibility for continuing education programs and primary and secondary schools the church had in eight countries in Polynesia and Latin America. In 1985, Christensen became president of Ricks College in Rexburg, Idaho.

In 1989, Christensen was called as a general authority in the LDS Church where, among other assignments, he served in the Presidency of the Seventy. He was designated as an emeritus general authority in 1999.

Christensen died on May 18, 2021, in Salt Lake City.

Speeches 
 "Resolutions"
 "Powerful Truths That Make a Difference in Our Lives"
 "On Making Revelation a Personal Reality"
 "The Responsibility of Our Heritage"

References

External links
Joe J. Christensen  Official profile

1929 births
2021 deaths
20th-century Mormon missionaries
American general authorities (LDS Church)
American Mormon missionaries in Mexico
American Mormon missionaries in the United States
Brigham Young University alumni
Church Educational System instructors
Counselors in the General Presidency of the Sunday School (LDS Church)
Latter Day Saints from Idaho
Members of the First Quorum of the Seventy (LDS Church)
Military personnel from Idaho
Mission presidents (LDS Church)
People from Franklin County, Idaho
Presidents of Brigham Young University–Idaho
Presidents of the Seventy (LDS Church)
Temple presidents and matrons (LDS Church)
Washington State University alumni
Religious leaders from Idaho